Naganori (written: 長矩, 長敦 or 修令) is a masculine Japanese given name. Notable people with the name include:

, Japanese daimyō
, Japanese automotive engineer
, Japanese samurai

Japanese masculine given names